Diallo M'Bodji Sène (born July 1952) is a statistician and administrator from Mali who served as Mali's Minister for the Promotion of Women, Children, and the Family.

Early life and education
Sène was born in July 1952 in Bamako. She earned a second degree in 1978 at the Demographic Centre of Romania (CEDOR).

Career and later life
From 1975 to 1991, Sène worked in Mali's National Directorate of Statistics and Informatics, the predecessor to the current  (National Institute of Statistics).

In 1991–1992, and again in 1997–2000, she was a technical advisor in the Ministère du Plan et de la Coopération internationale (ministry of planning and international cooperation). In 1992–1993 she was a project manager at the Ministère de l’Economie, des Finances et du Plan (ministry of economy, finances, and planning), and from 1993 to 1997 she was national economist for the Natcap project of the United Nations Development Programme (PNUD).

In 2000 she joined the Ministry for the Promotion of Women, Children and the Family (MPFEF) as a technical advisor. She became chief of staff and delegate head of the department of employment and professional promotion in 2002, and was confirmed as head of department in 2004. In 2005 she became the minister, serving until 2007. Her work at the ministry included literacy and citizenship education, the provision of equipment to women's organizations, and the development of rural training centres.

In 2009 she became head of the board of the Conseil de Régulation des Télécommunications (CRT, the telecommunications regulatory council), which in 2011 became the Malian Authority for the Regulation of Telecommunications, Information and Communication Technologies and Posts (AMRTP). She retired in 2013.

References

1952 births
Living people
21st-century Malian women politicians
21st-century Malian politicians
Malian statisticians
Women statisticians
People from Bamako
21st-century Malian people
21st-century women mathematicians